Saclas is a commune in the Essonne department in Île-de-France in northern France.

Inhabitants of Saclas are known as Saclasiens.

Geography
The Juine flows northeastward through the middle of the commune and crosses the village.

See also
Communes of the Essonne department

References

External links

Official website 

Mayors of Essonne Association 

Communes of Essonne